The following is a list of songs by Christian pop rock band ZOEgirl.

References

ZOEgirl